This article lists every club's goalscorers in the UEFA Super Cup.

Overall top goalscorers 

 Years in round brackets, e.g., (2009): Played, but did not score a goal.

Goalscorers by club 
Numbers in green means the player finished as the tournament top scorer (or joint top scorer). Years outlined in red indicate host nation status.

Aberdeen

Ajax 

a. Excludes the first competition held in 1972, not organised nor recognised by UEFA as an official title.

Anderlecht

Arsenal

Aston Villa

Atlético Madrid

Barcelona

Bayern Munich

Borussia Dortmund

Chelsea

CSKA Moscow

Dynamo Kyiv

Eintracht Frankfurt

Feyenoord 

Own goals scored for opponents

 Patrick Paauwe (scored for Real Madrid in 2002)

Galatasaray

Hamburger SV

Inter Milan

Juventus

Lazio

Liverpool

Manchester United

Mechelen

Milan

Nottingham Forest

Paris Saint-Germain

Parma

Porto

PSV Eindhoven

Real Madrid

Red Star Belgrade

Sampdoria

Sevilla

Shakhtar Donetsk

Steaua București

Valencia

Villarreal

Werder Bremen

Zaragoza

Zenit Saint Petersburg

See also 
 List of Intercontinental Cup goalscorers

References 

UEFA Super Cup